The Battle of Hartmannswillerkopf was a series of engagements during the First World War fought for the control of the Hartmannswillerkopf peak in Alsace in 1914 and 1915. Hartmanswillerkopf was captured by the French army during the Battle of Mulhouse  1914). From the vantage point, Mulhouse and the Mulhouse–Colmar railway could be seen and the French railway from Thann to Cernay and Belfort shielded from German observation.

The two French invasions and captures of Mulhouse by the French VII Corps ( Louis Bonneau) and then the Army of Alsace (General Paul Pau), were repulsed by the German 7th Army ( Josias von Heeringen). Both sides then stripped the forces in Alsace to reinforce the armies fighting on the Marne, Aisne and further north. For the rest of 1914 and 1915, both sides made intermittent attempts to capture Hartmanswillerkopf. The operations were costly and eventually after another period of attack and counter-attack that lasted into the new year of 1916, both sides accepted a stalemate, with a fairly stable front line along the western slopes that lasted until 1918.

Background

A few border skirmishes took place after Germany declared war on France; after 5 August, more German patrols were sent out as French attacks increased. French troops advanced from Gérardmer to the Col de la Schlucht (Schlucht Pass), where the Germans retreated and blew up the tunnel. On 8 August, Bonneau cautiously continued the advance and occupied Mulhouse, shortly after its German defenders had left. In the early morning of 9 August, parts of the XIV and XV Corps of the German 7th Army arrived from Strasbourg and counter-attacked at Cernay; Mulhouse was liberated by German troops on 10 August and Bonneau withdrew towards Belfort.

 Paul Pau was put in command of a new  to re-invade Alsace on 14 August, as part of a larger offensive by the First Army and the Second Army into Lorraine. The  began the new offensive against four German  brigades, which fought a delaying action as the French advanced from Belfort, two divisions on the right passing through Dannemarie at the head of the valley of the Ill river. On the left flank, two divisions advanced with several  battalions, which had moved into the Fecht valley on 12 August. On the evening of 14 August, Thann was captured and the most advanced French troops reached the western outskirts of the city by 16 August. On 18 August, VII Corps attacked Mulhouse and captured Altkirch on the south-eastern flank. By the evening of 19 August, the French had occupied the city, having captured   and considerable amounts of equipment. With the capture of the Rhine bridges and valleys leading into the plain, the French had gained control of Upper Alsace but on 26 August the French withdrew from Mulhouse to a more defensible line near Altkirch, to provide reinforcements for the French armies closer to Paris.

Prelude
The  was dissolved on 26 August and many of its units distributed among the remaining French armies. On 19 September 1914,  (An  was an improvised force larger than a corps and smaller than an army, subordinate to an army headquarters.) named after its commander  Hans Gaede (formerly the chief of staff of the XIV Corps) and renamed  (Army Detachment Gaede) on 30 January 1915.

Battle

1914–1915

On 25 December, the French 66th Division and a battalion of  attacked through deep snow and woods, to improve the French position on the peak of Hartmannswillerkopf. The French attack succeeded but the German defenders were pushed back only a short distance. Division  of  attacked on a line from Hartmannswillerkopf to the Herrengluh ruins, Wolfskopf and Amselkopf in thick fog from 18 to 21 January 1915 and managed to surround the French positions, recapturing the summit of Hartmannswillerkopf and Hirzstein to the south, a French counter-attack being repulsed. The main German attack on 30 January, near Wattwiller, made early progress then bogged down against the French defences. French attacks against Division  from 19 to 27 February were repulsed but on 26 February, a French attack gained . On 5 March, the French captured a blockhouse and a German counter-attack by two regiments was defeated.

The French attacked again on 17 and from 23 March – 6 April; on 26 March, after a preparatory bombardment, the 152nd Regiment captured the summit of Hartmannswillerkopf in ten minutes, taking 400 prisoners and finding that the ground had been stripped of trees by the artillery exchanges. The Germans suspended the offensive at Wattwiller and Steinbach to concentrate all reserves in the Hartmannswillerkopf area but on 17 March, the German army chief of staff, General Erich von Falkenhayn, ordered offensive operations in Alsace to cease. The French success had enabled artillery-observers to direct their guns onto the Colmar–Mulhouse railway and local German attacks on 25 April took back the peak; the French recaptured it the next day the 152nd Regiment suffering 825 casualties.

1915–1916

In December 1915,  Augustin Dubail commanding  (GAE: Eastern Army Group) planned a larger operation to consolidate the French position in the region by capturing Mulhouse. An attack on Hartmannswillerkopf  by the 66e Division (General ), which had been fighting in the area all year was to be the prelude to the larger attack. The division was given another 250 guns for the attack, two of which were super-heavy 370 mm Filloux mortars, an average of one gun per  of German front. After several postponements, the French bombardment began on 21 December from Hartmannswillerkopf to Wattwiller. In the afternoon the 66e Division attacked, taking the peak and trenches at Hirtzstein to the north-west of Wattwiller as German reserves established a new front line on the eastern slopes.

Next day,  Brigade 82 of the 12th  Division counter-attacked with reinforcements and re-took the peak, except for trenches on the north slope, which fell on 23 December. The French 152e  was almost annihilated, suffering 1,998 casualties from 21 to 22 December, along with Serret who was mortally wounded, the Germans taking 1,553 prisoners. On the afternoon of 24 December,  Brigade 82 tried to re-gain the lost trenches at Hirtzstein, with the assistance of flame thrower teams but achieved only a partial success. During the evening of 28 December, French attacks captured several positions between Hartmannswillerkopf and Hirzstein, followed by German counter-attacks during the night; from 29 to 30 December and on 1 January 1916. The original front line was restored and on 8 January,  Brigade 187 re-captured the trenches at Hirzstein that had been lost on 21 December.

Aftermath

Casualties
The fighting from 20 December 1915 to 8 January 1916 cost the French 7,465 casualties, about 50 per cent of the attacking force, of whom 1,103 were taken prisoner, along with thirty machine-guns. The Germans suffered 4,513 casualties, 1,700 men being taken prisoner.

Gallery

Notes

Footnotes

References

Books
 
 
 
 
 
 
 
 

Websites

Further reading

External links

 Vieil Armand
 Hartmannswillerkopf La montagne de la mort

Battles of World War I involving Germany
Battles of World War I involving France
Battles of the Western Front (World War I)
Conflicts in 1915
1915 in Germany
Battle of Hartmannswillerkopf